The H.B. Lothrop Store is a historic commercial building located at 210 Weir Street in Taunton, Massachusetts. The Italianate style building was constructed in 1855 by H.B. Lothrop who operated a grocery store here into the 1880s.

It was added to the National Register of Historic Places in 1984. However, since that time the original clapboard siding has been covered with vinyl siding, and much of the original wood detailing has been lost. The original decorative front canopy has also been replaced.

For a time the building was occupied by Art's International Bakery.

See also
National Register of Historic Places listings in Taunton, Massachusetts

References

National Register of Historic Places in Taunton, Massachusetts
Commercial buildings on the National Register of Historic Places in Massachusetts
Buildings and structures in Taunton, Massachusetts
Retail buildings in Massachusetts
Grocery store buildings